Brickellia seemannii is a Mexican species of flowering plants in the family Asteraceae. It is native to northwestern Mexico in the state of Sinaloa.

The species is named for German botanist Berthold Carl Seemann, 1825 - 1871. The species inhabits terrestrial environments.

References

seemannii
Flora of Sinaloa
Plants described in 1879